The men's vault competition at the 2012 Summer Olympics was held at the North Greenwich Arena on 6 August. It included 17 competitors from 14 nations.

Yang Hak-seon of South Korea won the gold, his nation's first victory in the event and first medal since 1996. Denis Ablyazin of Russia took silver, while Igor Radivilov earned Ukraine's first medal in the event as an independent nation.

Background

This was the 23rd appearance of the event at the Olympics. Two of the eight finalists from 2008 returned: seventh-place finisher Flavius Koczi of Romania and eighth-place finisher Isaac Botella of Spain. Yang Hak-seon of South Korea was the 2011 world champion and the favorite, particularly with the 2010 world champion, Thomas Bouhail of France, injured and unable to compete.

Chile and Hong Kong made their debuts in the men's vault competition. The United States made its 20th appearance, the most of any nation.

Competition format
The top eight vaulters in the qualification phase (with a limit of two per country) advanced to the apparatus final, with only those gymnasts who performed two vaults eligible to advance. The two scores were averaged to determine rankings. 

Qualification scores were then ignored, with only final-round scores counting.

Qualification results

Final results

References

Gymnastics at the 2012 Summer Olympics
2012
Men's 2012
Men's events at the 2012 Summer Olympics

zh:2012年夏季奧林匹克運動會體操男子自由體操比賽